Louis de Watteville (born Abraham Ludwig Karl von Wattenwyl; 1 July 1776 – 16 June 1836) was a Swiss mercenary in Dutch and British service. He became a major general in the British Army, and fought in the Napoleonic Wars and the War of 1812.

Early life and career
Watteville was born in Grandson, Switzerland to David Salomon von Wattenwyl and Elisabeth Magdalena Jenner, and first served as a mercenary in the Netherlands. In 1801 he took over the command of De Watteville's Regiment from his uncle, Franz Friedrich von Wattenwyl. The regiment entered British service, and de Watteville fought with it in the French campaign in Egypt and Syria.

Napoleonic Wars
Louis fought with the regiment at the Battle of Maida, in 1806, and at the Siege of Cádiz. He was appointed Colonel of his regiment in 1812. In the following year, he and the regiment were transferred from Cádiz to Upper Canada. By this time the regiment was a mixture of nationalities, including German, Italian and Hungarian, many of whom had been taken prisoner of war by the British while serving in the French armies in Spain.

War of 1812
On arrival at Québec, de Watteville immediately struck up a friendship with the Governor General of Canada, Lieutenant General Sir George Prevost, himself of Swiss origin. He received promotion to Major General on 11 August 1813, although for a time held no appointment. On 17 October, he was appointed to command the district of Montreal, which at the time was threatened by American armies approaching on two fronts. De Watteville immediately called out the militia and began strengthening his defences, but on 26 October, his collected outpost units under Lieutenant Colonel Charles de Salaberry defeated the nearest American force at the Battle of Chateauguay. De Watteville was present and gave full credit to de Salaberry in his dispatch. Prevost, however, who was also present, belittled both de Watteville and de Salaberry in his own dispatch, which took precedence over those of his subordinates.

In June 1814, de Watteville was transferred briefly to the Richelieu River sector, but on 8 August, he was appointed to command the "Right Division" on the Niagara River in Upper Canada, succeeding Major General Phineas Riall, who had been wounded and taken prisoner by the Americans at the Battle of Lundy's Lane. He reported to the siege lines around Fort Erie on 15 August. On 17 September, American troops made a sortie against de Watteville's lines, leading to a bloody engagement in which about 600 men were killed or wounded on each side.

As campaigning wound down over the winter, de Watteville took leave in Montreal to meet his wife and family. Here he learned that the War had ended. After presiding over the court martial of Major General Henry Procter, he resumed his command.

In late 1815, de Watteville was appointed commander in chief of the forces in Upper Canada. He preferred to retire from the army and returned to Switzerland. He bought an estate in Rubigen, and was a member of the Grand Council of Bern from 1817 to 1831. He died in Rubigen on 16 June 1836.

De Watteville's Regiment

Note: de Watteville's regiment, although no longer under his command from the date of his promotion to Major General, suffered heavy casualties at Fort Erie, and also suffered heavily from desertion. As already mentioned, by the time it arrived in Canada it was a motley mix of nationalities with little obvious cause for loyalty to the British cause. On the end of the war, several of its survivors accepted discharge on the spot, and settled in Upper Canada. The members of the regiment were offered land grants.

References

External links
 Biography at the Dictionary of Canadian Biography Online

1776 births
1836 deaths
Swiss mercenaries
18th-century Swiss military personnel
19th-century Swiss military personnel
British Army generals
British Army personnel of the French Revolutionary Wars
British Army personnel of the Napoleonic Wars
British Army personnel of the War of 1812